The Trouble with Men and Women is a 2005 film written and directed by Tony Fisher and starring Joseph McFadden and Kate Ashfield.

Plot
Serious and intense Matt is tired of mooning over a woman who has deserted him for a life in the United States. After enduring the bar room philosophising of his friends as they vainly try to cheer him up, he starts dating various women, desperate for an understanding of the opposite sex. Yet he may well harbour the notion that it is his best mate's girlfriend that he is destined to be with.

Cast
 Joseph McFadden – Matt
 Kate Ashfield – Susie
 Matthew Delamere – Vinnie

Music
 Matt Cattell Innovation of Sound - Sam Gibb  –

External links
 

2005 films
2005 drama films
British drama films
2000s English-language films
2000s British films